This article lists Fellows of the Royal Society who were elected in 2021.

Fellows

 Julie Ahringer
 Glen Barber
 Paul Bates
 Richard Benton
 William Bond
 Ian L. Boyd
 Nigel Brandon
 Peter Campbell
 Frank Close
 David Craik
 Donald B. Dingwell
 Connie Eaves
 Sadaf Farooqi
 Ten Feizi
 Michael Finnis
 Julie Forman-Kay
 Jane Francis
 Vernonica Franklin-Tong
 Usha Goswami
 Hugh Griffiths
 Andy Haldane
 Geoffrey Hall
 Karen Heywood
 Adrian V. S. Hill
 Richard Horne, Head
 Gregory Houseman
 Rebecca Kilner
 Roger Lemon
 Fiona Marshall
 Thomas Muir
 Frances Platt
 Jeremy Quastel
 Marilyn Renfree
 David Rowitch
 Richard Samworth
 Sjors Scheres
 Bernard F. Schutz
 Abigail Sellen
 David Silver
 Benjamin Simons
 Endre Süli
 Richard S. Sutton
 Christopher G. Tate
 Philip Torr, Professor
 Thirumalai Venkatesan
 Karen Vogtmann
 Bruce Weir
 Simon Wessely
 Stanley Whittingham
 Charlotte Williams

Honorary Fellows

 John Kingman

Foreign Members

 Stephen J. Benkovic
 Anny Cazenave
 Elena Conti
 Stanley Deser
 Vishva Dixit
 Michael I. Jordan
 V. Narry Kim
 Sang Yup Lee
 Giacomo Rizzolatti
 Claire Voisin

References

2021
2021 in the United Kingdom
2021 in science